Itata was a three-masted iron barque built by R & J Evans, Liverpool in 1883. She was severely damaged by a fire in her hold at Newcastle, New South Wales, Australia, in 1906. Her hulk was towed to Sydney and was scuttled in Saltpan Creek, Middle Harbour.

The location is  -33.8151031, 151.2246810

Fate
While awaiting loading of one hold with coal alongside a wharf, she was severely damaged by fire at Newcastle, 12 January 1906 after another hold with a nitrate cargo caught fire. The resultant fire and explosions bowed and twisted her iron hull. She was towed to Sydney for use as a hulk, however was too badly damaged and was scuttled in Saltpan Creek, Middle Harbour.

Currently the Itata is often used as a training site for wreck diving dive courses.

Notes

1883 ships
Ships built on the River Mersey
Maritime incidents in 1906
1871–1900 ships of Australia
Colliers of Australia
Barques of Australia
Ship fires
Scuttled vessels
Shipwrecks of the Sydney Eastern Suburbs Region